Kebeloba (also, Khebel’oba) is a village in the Zaqatala Rayon of Azerbaijan.  The village forms part of the municipality of Car.

References

External links

Populated places in Zaqatala District